Munuscong Lake is a section of the St. Marys River in Chippewa County in the U.S. state of Michigan, with the northeastern edge of the lake forming part of the riparian bottomland of the Canadian province of Ontario.  Hydrologically the lake and river section are an arm of Lake Huron, and Munuscong Lake shares a common water level with the Great Lake into which it flows.

Munuscong Lake is bounded by the Upper Peninsula, Neebish Island in Michigan, and St. Joseph Island in Ontario. It drains via the DeTour Passage into Lake Huron.

References

Lakes of Michigan
Lakes of Ontario